Australia competed at the 1968 Summer Olympics in Mexico City, Mexico.  Australian athletes have competed in every Summer Olympic Games. 128 competitors, 104 men and 24 women, took part in 105 events in 16 sports.

The uniforms for Australia's female athletes were designed by Zara Holt, the widow of prime minister Harold Holt who had drowned in December 1967. They consisted of one design in "wattle yellow" for official use and a casual outfit in "Olympic green" crimplene.

Medalists

Gold
 Ralph Doubell – Athletics, Men's 800m
 Maureen Caird – Athletics, Women's 80m Hurdles
 Lyn McClements – Swimming, Women's 100m Butterfly
 Michael Wenden – Swimming, Men's 100m Freestyle
 Michael Wenden – Swimming, Men's 200m Freestyle

Silver
 Peter Norman – Athletics, Men's 200m,
 Raelene Boyle – Athletics, Women's 200m
 Pamela Kilborn-Ryan-Nelson – Athletics, Women's 80m Hurdles
 Arthur Busch, Paul Dearing, James Mason, Brian Glencross, Gordon Pearce, Julian Pearce, Robert Haigh, Donald Martin, Raymond Evans, Ronald Riley, Patrick Nilan, Donald Smart, Fred Quine, Eric Pearce and Desmond Piper – Field Hockey, Men's Team Competition
 Alf Duval, Michael Morgan, Joseph Fazio, Peter Dickson, David Douglas, John Ranch, Gary Malcolm Pearce, Robert Alan Shirlaw, and Alan Geoffrey Grover – Rowing, Men's Eight with Coxswain (8+)
 Lynne Watson, Judy Playfair, Lyn McClements, and Janet Steinbeck – Swimming, Women's 4 × 100 m Medley Relay
 Greg Rogers, Graham White, Bob Windle, and Michael Wenden – Swimming, Men's 4 × 200 m Freestyle Relay

Bronze
 Jennifer Lamy-Frank – Athletics, Women's 200m
 Brian Cobcroft & Depeche, Wayne Roycroft & Zhivago, and　Bill Roycroft & Warrathoola – Equestrian, Eventing Team Competition
 Greg Brough – Swimming, Men's 1500m Freestyle
 Karen Lynne Moras – Swimming, Women's 400m Freestyle
 Greg Rogers, Robert Cusack, Bob Windle, and Michael Wenden – Swimming, Men's 4 × 100 m Freestyle Relay

Athletics

Men's 3.000m Steeplechase
Kerry O'Brien
 Qualifying Heat — 9:01.49
 Final — 8:52.08 (→ 4th place)

Men's High Jump
Lawrie Peckham
 Qualifying Round — 2.14m
 Final — 2.12m (→ 8th place)

Boxing

Canoeing

Cycling

Nine cyclists represented Australia in 1968.

Individual road race
 Ronald Jonker
 Peter McDermott
 Kevin Morgan
 Donald Wilson

Team time trial
 Donald Wilson
 Kevin Morgan
 Peter McDermott
 Dave Watson

Sprint
 Gordon Johnson
 John Nicholson

1000m time trial
 Hilton Clarke

Tandem
 Gordon Johnson
 Hilton Clarke

Individual pursuit
 John Bylsma

Diving

Equestrian

Fencing

Five fencers, all men, represented Australia in 1968.

Men's foil
 Russell Hobby
 Graeme Jennings
 Bill Ronald

Men's épée
 Russell Hobby
 Bill Ronald
 Graeme Jennings

Men's team épée
 Russell Hobby, Peter Macken, Graeme Jennings, Bill Ronald, Duncan Page

Gymnastics

Hockey

Modern pentathlon

Three male pentathletes represented Australia in 1968.

Men's Individual Competition:
 Peter Macken – 4284 points (31st place)
 Duncan Page – 3904 points (39th place)
 Donald McMikin – 3759 points (42nd place)

Men's Team Competition:
 Macken, Page, and McMikin – 11959 points (12th place)

Rowing

Sailing

Shooting

Three shooters, all men, represented Australia in 1968.
Mixed

Swimming

Weightlifting

Wrestling

References

Nations at the 1968 Summer Olympics
1968
Olympics